The 1956 Colorado Buffaloes football team was an American football team that represented the University of Colorado in the Big Seven Conference during the 1956 NCAA University Division football season. Led by ninth-year head coach Dallas Ward, the Buffaloes compiled and overall record of 8–2–1 with a mark of 4–1–1 in conference play, placing second in the Big 7. The team played its home games on campus at Folsom Field in Boulder, Colorado.

Colorado was runner-up in the conference to undefeated Oklahoma, 
whose winning streak had reached 40 games and who declared the consensus national champion. The Sooners did not play in a bowl game due to the Big Seven's no-repeat rule;, so Colorado was invited to the Orange Bowl in Miami, and defeated Clemson, 27–21.

Schedule

References

Colorado
Colorado Buffaloes football seasons
Orange Bowl champion seasons
Colorado Buffaloes football